Mario Todorović (born 11 October 1988 in Dubrovnik, Croatia) is a Croatian swimmer. He competed in the 100m butterfly and 4 × 100 m medley relay events at the 2008 Summer Olympics and in the 50 m freestyle event at the 2012 and 2016 Summer Olympics. Todorović also won a gold medal in the 2009 Mediterranean Games 50m butterfly and a silver medal in the 2008 European Aquatics Championships 4 × 100 m medley relay.

References 

1988 births
Sportspeople from Dubrovnik
Living people
Croatian male swimmers
Croatian male freestyle swimmers
Male butterfly swimmers
Olympic swimmers of Croatia
Serbs of Croatia
Swimmers at the 2008 Summer Olympics
Swimmers at the 2012 Summer Olympics
Swimmers at the 2016 Summer Olympics
European Aquatics Championships medalists in swimming

Mediterranean Games gold medalists for Croatia
Swimmers at the 2009 Mediterranean Games
Mediterranean Games medalists in swimming
21st-century Croatian people